Nelson La Due was a member of the Wisconsin State Assembly.

Biography
La Due was born on April 15, 1831 in Dutchess County, New York. He died on January 31, 1900.

Career
La Due was a member of the Assembly in 1879. Other positions he held include Chairman of the county board of supervisors of Lafayette County, Wisconsin. He was a Republican.

References

External links

People from Dutchess County, New York
People from Lafayette County, Wisconsin
Republican Party members of the Wisconsin State Assembly
County supervisors in Wisconsin
1831 births
1900 deaths
Burials in Wisconsin
19th-century American politicians